Achada Tenda is a town in the northern part of the island of Santiago, Cape Verde. In 2010 its population was 1,242. It is situated on the east coast, 10 km southeast of Tarrafal. The small bay Porto Formoso is situated near the town.

References

Geography of Santiago, Cape Verde
Tarrafal Municipality
Towns in Cape Verde